Okome is a parish and village in Falkenberg, Sweden. The village has a population of about 160, and the parish as a whole has a population of about 500. The village has some services, such as a primary school and a car repair shop. As well as Okome Village the parish also includes Köinge and Svartrå, as well as parts of Ätrafors.

References 

Falkenberg Municipality